Robert Hepple (18 January 1898 – 1970) was an English professional footballer who played as a winger.

Career
Born in Mickley, Northumberland, Hepple signed for Bradford City in May 1920 after playing minor football, leaving the club in June 1921 to sign for Reading. During his time with Bradford City he made three appearances in the Football League.

Sources

References

1898 births
1970 deaths
Date of death missing
English footballers
Bradford City A.F.C. players
Reading F.C. players
English Football League players
Association football wingers
People from Mickley, Northumberland
Footballers from Northumberland